Adam Lindsay was, with Thomas Wall, a cofounder of the Maryland Company of Comedians, the first resident theatrical company in Baltimore, Maryland. It was founded in 1781. He owned a coffee house prior to working with Wall, and returned to that profession after 1785.

References
American Theatre Companies, 1749-1887, by Weldon B. Durham; Greenwood Press, 1986. 

Businesspeople from Baltimore
American theatre managers and producers
Year of birth unknown
Year of death unknown